The Cleveland mayoral election of 1963 saw the re-election of Ralph S. Locher.  Mayor Locher ran unopposed in the general election.

General election

References

Mayoral elections in Cleveland
Cleveland mayoral
Cleveland
November 1963 events
1960s in Cleveland